This list of the largest optical reflecting telescopes with objective diameters of  or greater is sorted by aperture, which is a measure of the light-gathering power and resolution of a reflecting telescope. The mirrors themselves can be larger than the aperture, and some telescopes may use aperture synthesis through interferometry. Telescopes designed to be used as optical astronomical interferometers such as the Keck I and II used together as the Keck Interferometer (up to 85 m) can reach higher resolutions, although at a narrower range of observations. When the two mirrors are on one mount, the combined mirror spacing of the Large Binocular Telescope (22.8 m) allows fuller use of the aperture synthesis.

Largest does not always equate to being the best telescopes, and overall light gathering power of the optical system can be a poor measure of a telescope's performance. Space-based telescopes, such as the Hubble Space Telescope, take advantage of being above the Earth's atmosphere to reach higher resolution and greater light gathering through longer exposure times. Location in the northern or southern hemisphere of the Earth can also limit what part of the sky can be observed, and climate conditions at the observatory site affect how often the telescope can be used each year.

The combination of large mirrors, locations selected for stable atmosphere and favorable climate conditions, and active optics and adaptive optics to correct for much of atmospheric turbulence allow the largest Earth based telescopes to reach higher resolution than the Hubble Space Telescope. Another advantage of Earth based telescopes is the comparatively low cost of upgrading and replacing instruments.

Table of reflecting telescopes

This list is ordered by optical aperture, which has historically been a useful gauge of limiting resolution, optical area, physical size, and cost. Multiple mirror telescopes that are on the same mount and can form a single combined image are ranked by their equivalent aperture. Fixed altitude telescopes (e.g. HET) are also ranked by their equivalent aperture. All telescopes with an effective aperture of at least  at visible or near-infrared wavelengths are included.

There are only a few sites capable of polishing the mirrors for these telescopes. SAGEM in France polished the four VLT mirrors, the two Gemini mirrors, and the 36 segments for GTC. The Steward Observatory Mirror Lab cast and polished the two LBT mirrors, the two Magellan mirrors, the MMT replacement mirror, and the LSST primary/tertiary mirror. It is currently making the mirrors for the Giant Magellan Telescope. The Keck segments were made by Schott AG. The SALT and LAMOST segments were cast and polished by LZOS. The mirror for Subaru was cast by Corning and polished at Contraves Brashear Systems in Pennsylvania.

This table does not include all the largest mirrors manufactured. The Steward Observatory Mirror Lab produced the 6.5-metre f/1.25 collimator used in the Large Optical Test and Integration Site of Lockheed Martin, used for vacuum optical testing of other telescopes.

Segmented mirrors are also referred to as mosaic mirrors. Single mirrors are also referred to monolithic mirrors, and can be sub-categorized in types, such as solid or honeycomb.

Chronological list of largest telescopes
These telescopes were the largest in the world at the time of their construction, by the same aperture criterion as above.

Future telescopes

Under construction

These telescopes are currently under construction and will meet the list inclusion criteria once completed:

 Extremely Large Telescope, Chile — . First light planned in 2027.
 Thirty Meter Telescope, Hawaii, USA — . Construction began in 2014 but halted in 2015;  it has not resumed.
 Giant Magellan Telescope, Chile — seven 8.4 m mirrors on a single mount. This provides an effective aperture equivalent to a 21.4 m mirror and the resolving power equivalent to a 24.5 m mirror. First light planned in 2029.
 Vera C. Rubin Observatory, Chile — . First light planned in 2024.
 San Pedro Martir Telescope, Baja California, Mexico — . First light planned in 2023.
 Magdalena Ridge Observatory Interferometer, New Mexico, USA — An optical interferometer array with ten  telescopes. The light gathering power is equivalent to a  single aperture. The first telescope was installed in 2016; construction was paused in 2019 due to insufficient funding and has not resumed.
 Timau National Observatory, Indonesia — . First light planned in 2021.

Proposed

Selected large telescopes which are in detailed design or pre-construction phases:

 Large UV Optical Infrared Surveyor (LUVOIR), a proposed space telescope for launch in the mid 2030s.
 Tokyo Atacama Observatory (TAO) 
 Chinese Giant Solar Telescope (CGST), an infrared and optical solar telescope, with light-gathering power equivalent to a 5 m diameter aperture 
 Advanced Liquid-mirror Probe of Astrophysics, Cosmology and Asteroids (ALPACA), a proposed Earth-based 8-metre telescope, by Arlin Crotts of Columbia University

See also
 List of largest infrared telescopes
 List of telescope types
 Lists of telescopes

References

Further reading

External links
 List of large reflecting telescopes
 The World's Largest Optical Telescopes
 Largest optical telescopes of the world
 Selected largest telescopes
 Sidereal Messenger Large refracting telescopes (date 1884)

Optical telescopes
Largest optical telescopes
Telescope